Wade is the English name for a common Germanic mythological character who, depending on location, is also known as Vadi (Norse) and Wate (Middle High German).

Overview
The earliest mention occurs in the Old English poem Widsith.
According to the Þiðrekssaga, he was born between king Wilkinus and a serpent-legged mermaid named Wachilt, who was a goddess of the sea and sometimes referred to as a "sea witch". His famous son is Wayland, and grandson Wudga. Though not explicitly given as such, Egil and Slagfin may be Wade's sons, since they are Wayland's brothers according to the Poetic Edda.

The medieval English romance about Wade once existed, for Chaucer alluded to the "Tale of Wade" in one of his works, Troilus and Criseyde, and used the phrase "Wade's boat", meaning some sort of trickery, in The Merchant's Tale. The tale and the boat was apparently familiar, at the end of the 16th century, to an editor of Chaucer's works Thomas Speght, who remarked that Wade's boat bore the name Guingelot. To the Angles, Wade was the Keeper of the Ford, and acted as both ferryman and protector.

Thidrekssaga
Wade has always had a strong association with the sea or water. In the saga about Wade's family, the Vilkina saga (also known as the (Þiðrekssaga), it is said that Wade (Vadi) was born between King Vilkinus and a mermaid (normalized spelling, ; text: gen. , lit. "sea woman").

Wade first apprenticed his son Wayland to Mimir, from age 9 to 12, and later to two dwarfs living in mount Kallava. He went from his home in Sjoland (Sjælland, i.e., Zealand) to Grœnasund sound (in Denmark), and finding no ship sailing out, he waded across the sound in waters nine ells deep while carrying his young son Wayland on his shoulder. After the boy studied for two stretches of 12 months, Wade came to fetch his son from the reluctant dwarfs, and was killed in a landslide caused by an earthquake.

In the aftermath, the son (Wayland) slays the dwarfs and sets off in a boat he crafts, windowed with glass, reaching the land of king Nidung.

Wade's boat in Chaucer
In Chaucer's Merchant' Tale occurs the following reference to Wade's boat:

It is clear that, in this context, Wade's boat is being used as a sexual euphemism. However, it is debatable whether this single indirect reference can be taken to demonstrate fertility aspects are a part of his character.

Guingelot
Thomas Speght, an editor of Chaucer's works from the end of 16th century, made a passing remark that "Concerning Wade and his bote called Guingelot, and also his strange exploits in the same, because the matter is long and fabulous, I pass it over" There may have been widespread knowledge of Wade's adventure in his time, but it has not been transmitted to the present day, and Speght's omission has been deplored by subsequent commentators. "Wingelock" is Skeat's reconstructed Anglicized form of the boat's name.

The boat's name closely resembles Gringolet, the name of Sir Gawaine's horse. Gollancz tries to make a reconstruction on the Germanic origins of the name, but it is based on a lot of assumptions: that Wade's boat was a winged boat, whose Germanic name was Wingalet or Wingalock, confused with Wade's son Wayland's feathered flying contraption. And while he concedes that the better form of the horse's name is "Guingelot" without the "r", he was dismissive of the view the name was of Celtic in origin, as expressed by Gaston Paris.

Old English fragment of Wade
In the 19th century, three lines from the lost Old English Tale of Wade were found, quoted in a Latin homily in MS. 255 in the Library of Peterhouse, Cambridge:

On the same passage, Gollancz gave the following alternate translation: "We may say with Wade that [all creatures who fell] became elves or adders or nickors who live in pools; not one became a man except Hildebrand"

The context of the quote has been variously conjectured. Rickert speculated that the situation resembled the scene in the Waldere fragment, "in which Widia, Wate's grandson, and Hildebrand rescue Theodoric from a den of monsters". Karl P. Wentersdorf stated that "Wade is here boasting of his victorious adventures with many kinds of creatures". Alaric Hall ventures that some antagonistic force has magically "sent" monstrous beings to beset Wade, though he cautions that the fragment is too short for certainty.

Folklore
Stones at Mulgrave near Whitby were said to be the grave of the dead sea-giant (they were known as ). A tale was told of Sleights Moor in Eskdale, North Yorkshire. During the building of Mulgrave Castle and Pickering Castle, Wade and his wife Bell would throw a hammer to and fro over the hills. (A possible Roman road, called "Wade's Causeway" or "Wade's Wife's Causey" locally, was also said to have been built in this manner.) One day Wade's son grew impatient for his milk and hurled a stone that weighed a few tonnes across Eskdale to where his mother was milking her cow at Swarthow on Egton Low Moor. The stone hit Bell with such force that a part of it broke off and could be seen for many years until it was broken up to mend the highways.

In local folklore, the Hole of Horcum in North Yorkshire was formed where Wade scooped up earth to throw at his wife.

Legacy 

The Middle-earth character Eärendil sails the sky in a ship named Vingilot or Wingelot, which scholars note is close to the name of Wade's boat Guingelot. In one of his linguistic writings, Parma Eldalamberon 15, the creator of Middle-earth, J. R. R. Tolkien, explicitly noted "Wade = Earendel". Tolkien's biographer Humphrey Carpenter remarked that Eärendil "was in fact the beginning of Tolkien's own mythology".

Footnotes

Explanatory notes

Citations

References

Further reading

Branston, "The Lost Gods of England", 1957
Chaucer, "Troilus and Criseyde"
Ellis Davidson, H. R.  "Gods and Myths of the Viking Age", 1996
Jordsvin, "Wayland Smith", Idunna, Fall 2004
Poetic Edda, Völundarkviða

Germanic mythology
English folklore
English heroic legends
Northumbrian folklore